The Indianapolis Cultural Trail, officially the Indianapolis Cultural Trail: A Legacy of Gene & Marilyn Glick, is an  urban shared-use path and linear park located in the vicinity of downtown Indianapolis, Indiana. The trail is often compared to other popular bicycle and pedestrian paths across the U.S. and has inspired similar projects throughout the U.S. and Canada.

Description
The Indianapolis Cultural Trail is an urban multi-use trail. The trail is identifiable with tinted concrete pavers, providing visual continuity. Street furniture, trash receptacles, signage, and lighting are also consistent throughout the trail's route.

Route

The Indianapolis Cultural Trail is composed of a downtown loop and three spurs. The northeastern spur follows Massachusetts Ave., terminating at its connection to the Monon Trail near 10th and Bellefontaine streets. The southeastern spur follows Virginia Ave., terminating at its intersection with Prospect and Shelby streets in the Fountain Square neighborhood. A two-way cycle track along Shelby St. links the trail with the Pleasant Run Greenway. A short southern spur follows Capitol Ave., connecting the Indiana Convention Center and Lucas Oil Stadium, terminating at South St. In 2020 plans started for a two-mile extension to the trail which bring areas of Indiana Avenue and South Street in closer proximity to the city center. 

The trail intersects with the Canal Walk, a  pedestrian loop flanking the former Indiana Central Canal.

Glick Peace Walk
The walk can be accessed at W Walnut St. between N Meridian St. and N Capitol Ave.

Attractions

Indianapolis has seven designated cultural districts, first established in 1999. The purpose of these designations was to capitalize on cultural institutions within historically significant neighborhoods unique to the city's heritage for economic development and revitalization.  Six of the seven districts are located along the Indianapolis Cultural Trail:
 Canal and White River State Park
 Fountain Square
 Indiana Avenue
 Market East
 Mass Ave
 Wholesale District

Public art

, there are nine commissioned art installations along the trail:
 Ann Dancing (Julian Opie)
 Care/Don’t Care (Jamie Pawlus)
 Chatham Passage (Sean Derry)
 Looking Through Windows (Michael Kuschnir)
 Moving Forward (Donna Sink)
 Poet’s Place
 Prairie Modules 1 & 2 (M12)
 Swarm Street (Acconci Studio)
 Talking Wall (Bernard Williams)

In addition to commissioned art, the Arts Council of Indianapolis's "Indy Arts Guide" lists 61 pieces of public art along or near the trail . In August 2018, Citizens Energy Group partnered with the Harrison Center to install 20 artist-designed manhole covers along the trail. The initiative sought to bring public attention to Indianapolis waterways and the $1.9 billion DigIndy project to address the city's combined sewer overflows (CSOs) by 2025.

History

After 12 years of planning and six years of construction, the Indianapolis Cultural Trail: A Legacy of Gene & Marilyn Glick officially opened in 2013.

Indiana Pacers Bikeshare

Indianapolis Cultural Trail, Inc. operates, maintains, and promotes the city's public bicycle-sharing system, Indiana Pacers Bikeshare, consisting of 50 stations and 525 bicycles. The Cultural Trail, in partnership with BCycle and the Herbert Simon Family Foundation, launched Pacers Bikeshare on April 22, 2014 with an initial 29 stations and 251 bicycles. An expansion was completed on September 5, 2019, nearly doubling available bikes and docking stations. About half of the Indianapolis Cultural Trail's annual $1 million budget is allocated to managing the program, which is self-sustaining through bike rental fees, annual memberships, grants, and sponsorships.

Impact
According to the Indianapolis Business Journal, early grant applications predicted $863 million in development generated within a  radius of the trail. An Indiana University Public Policy Institute report released in March 2015 found that assessed value of properties within  of the trail increased by $1 billion from 2008 to 2014. Other key finds from the report:

 Trail usage along the trail exceeds that of most other Indianapolis trails and greenways
 Users feel safe on the trail
 Exercise and recreation is the primary reason for use
 Businesses located on the trail have hired additional employees
 Property values have increased along and near the trail
 Users reported spending and economic impact tied to trail usage

The trail has also been considered a boon for convention business and inspired interest from cities throughout the U.S. and Europe.

See also
List of cycleways
List of attractions and events in Indianapolis
List of parks in Indianapolis
Transportation in Indianapolis

References

External links 

Streetfilms "The Indianapolis Cultural Trail: The Next-Gen in U.S. Protected Bike Lanes"

Parks in Indianapolis
Transportation in Indianapolis
Tourist attractions in Indianapolis
Bike paths in Indiana
Linear parks
2008 establishments in Indiana
Non-profit organizations based in Indianapolis